Guy Mairesse (10 August 1910 – 24 April 1954) was a French racing driver.  He participated in three Formula One World Championship Grands Prix, debuting on 3 September 1950.  He scored no championship points.

Mairesse built a haulage business during the interwar period, and became interested in motor sport in 1946 through his friendship with Le Mans driver, Paul Vallée. He won the Lyon-Charbonnières Rally in 1947 and then purchased a Delahaye from Vallée for 1948, with which he was victorious at Chimay.

In 1949 Mairesse joined Vallée's team, Ecurie France, to race the Lago-Talbot and took fourth place at Pau and fifth at Albi. In 1950 he finished second at Le Mans with Pierre Meyrat using a single seat Talbot. Towards the end of that season the Vallée team closed and Mairesse purchased the Le Mans car and a Lago-Talbot T26C, which he used to enter the 1950 Italian Grand Prix, from which he retired, and the Swiss and French Grands Prix in 1951, finishing 11 laps down and "not classified" on both occasions. Thereafter his business commitments curtailed his involvement in racing and he sold his cars in 1952 appearing infrequently in other owners' machinery.

Mairesse was killed in practice for the Coupe de Paris at Montlhéry in 1954, when he swerved to avoid another car and crashed into a concrete wall.

Racing record

Complete Formula One World Championship results
(key)

References

French racing drivers
French Formula One drivers
Grand Prix drivers
1910 births
1954 deaths
Racing drivers who died while racing
Sport deaths in France
24 Hours of Le Mans drivers
World Sportscar Championship drivers